WVRZ (99.7 FM) is a radio station located in Mount Carmel, Pennsylvania. It is a simulcast of Top 40 (CHR) formatted WVRT (V97).

External links

VRZ
Contemporary hit radio stations in the United States
Radio stations established in 1990
IHeartMedia radio stations